El Encuentro may refer to:
 El Encuentro (Marcos Witt album), 2002
 El Encuentro (Vico C album), 2006
 El Encuentro (Dino Saluzzi album), 2009 
 El Encuentro (Mijares album), 1995